Juan Armet de Castellví, nicknamed "Kinké" (30 June 1895 in Terrassa – 5 October 1956 in Madrid) was a Spanish footballer who played as a forward, and later a coach.

Club career
Born in Terrassa, Catalonia, Kinké began to play football in 1911 with Universitary SC, featuring alongside the likes of Ricardo Zamora. After 5 seasons with the club, he joined Espanyol in 1916, with whom he played for one year. At the end of the season, he was transferred to Sevilla, with whom he played for the next ten seasons, retiring as a footballer in 1927 at the age of thirty-two.

International career
While a Espanyol player, he was eligible to play for the Catalonia national team, and in May 1916, he was part of the Catalan team that won the second edition of the Prince of Asturias Cup in 1916, an inter-regional competition organized by the RFEF. In the decisive game against a Castile/Madrid XI, Kinké scored two goals in an 2-2 draw that was enough for the Catalans to win the cup for the first time.

When he joined Sevilla, he become eligible to play for the Andalusia national team, being in the line-up of the team's first-ever international match on 19 November 1922 against a Valencia XI, which was held at the Campo de Algirós as the quarter-finals of the 1922-23 Prince of Asturias Cup, and they won 2-1 with Kinké being the author of the first goal in the team's history. But in the semi-finals, they were knocked out by Galicia after a 1-4 loss, with Kinké scoring the consolation goal. In the following campaign, Andalusia beat the Valencians in the quarter-finals again with Kinké scoring once in a 3-2 win, but then they were once again eliminated in the semi-finals, this time by the Castile/Madrid XI. Kinké is the all-time top goal scorer of the prince of Asturias Cup along with José Luis Zabala and Juan Monjardín, who also scored 6 goals in the competition.

Managerial career
Armet was the manager of Real Madrid since 1941 until September 1943. He also coached Real Betis, Real Murcia, Olímpica Jienense and CE Sabadell FC.

Honours

International
Catalonia

Prince of Asturias Cup:
Champions (1): 1916

Records
All-time top goal scorer of the Prince of Asturias Cup with 6 goals.

References

1895 births
Footballers from Terrassa
Spanish footballers
RCD Espanyol footballers
Sevilla FC players
Spanish football managers
Valencia CF managers
Real Betis managers
Real Madrid CF managers
Real Murcia managers
CE Sabadell FC managers
1956 deaths
Association football forwards
Catalonia international footballers